Tsai Pi-ru (born 11 March 1964) is a Taiwanese politician. She was a nurse and colleague of Ko Wen-je at National Taiwan University Hospital. After Ko was elected Mayor of Taipei in 2014, Tsai began her political career as Ko's chief of staff. In 2019, she became a founding member of the Taiwan People's Party led by Ko, and was elected to the 10th Legislative Yuan via party list proportional representation in 2020. Tsai resigned her legislative seat in 2022, and was replaced by Cynthia Wu.

Early life, education, and career 
Tsai was born on 11 March 1964 in Pingtung County. She graduated from Meiho University with a degree in midwifery. Tsai also attended Tamkang University's Management Information System Department on a part-time basis, completing a master's degree in 2019. Tamkang revoked Tsai's degree in 2022. Before pursuing politics, Tsai worked as a nurse at National Taiwan University Hospital, including over twenty years alongside surgeon Ko Wen-je.

Political career
After Ko Wen-je was elected mayor of Taipei, Tsai joined his administration as chief of staff. She became an adviser to the Taipei City Government in 2018. Tsai is a founding member of the Taiwan People's Party, established in August 2019. During the 2020 Taiwanese legislative election cycle, Tsai commented on the TPP party list, but did not confirm her own placement on it. Eventually, Tsai ranked fifth on the party list and was seated to the 10th Legislative Yuan. In August 2022, Wang Hao-yu accused Tsai of plagiarizing her master's thesis. Tamkang University concluded an investigation into the allegations in October and revoked her degree. She posted a resignation letter to Facebook on 14 October 2022, and vacated her legislative seat on 17 October.

References

Politicians of the Republic of China on Taiwan from Taipei
Taiwanese political party founders
Taiwan People's Party Members of the Legislative Yuan
Living people
People involved in plagiarism controversies
Party List Members of the Legislative Yuan
1964 births
Taiwanese women nurses
21st-century Taiwanese women politicians
Members of the 10th Legislative Yuan
Politicians of the Republic of China on Taiwan from Pingtung County
Tamkang University alumni